Liz Bacon (born 27 September 1963) is Principal and Vice-Chancellor of Abertay University, Dundee.

Background

Liz Bacon grew up in Kenley, Surrey. She studied for an undergraduate degree in computer science at Thames Polytechnic, spending her third year on an industrial placement at CERN, graduating in 1986. She studied for her PhD in the field of artificial intelligence at the University of Greenwich, and was awarded her doctorate in 1993.
Bacon is currently the past President of the BCS, The Chartered Institute for IT , and has had many serious roles, including the Chair of the BCS Academy, a BCS Council member and Trustee of the BCS. She has been a Council Member of PITCOM, the Parliamentary IT Committee, responsible for communications, Past President of EQANIE (European Quality Assurance Network for Informatics Education), the National HE STEM Programme and an ICT thought leader for the University of Cambridge International Examinations. Bacon has been involved in software engineering and e-learning research for more than 10 years 
 

She was one of the 30 women identified in the BCS Women in IT Campaign in 2014 source
and was then featured in the e-book of these 30 women in IT,  "Women in IT: Inspiring the next generation" produced by the BCS, The Chartered Institute for IT, as a free download e-book, from various sources.

In 2015, Bacon became a Principal Fellow of the HEA  and was identified as the 35th Most Influential Women in UK IT 2015, by Computer Weekly.

Academia
Professor of computer science and previous Deputy Vice-Chancellor (academic) at Abertay University, Scotland, previously professor of software engineering and Deputy Pro Vice-Chancellor at the University of Greenwich, England.
Past President  and Trustee of BCS, the Chartered Institute for IT., and was elected president of BCS for one year from March 2014. 
Inaugural Chair of the BCS Academy of Computing, the first Learned Society in the UK for Computing, 
Previously  president and trustee of the BCS, the Chartered Institute for IT. 
Past Chair of the CPHC, past Member of Council and Communications Officer for PITCOM (Parliamentary IT Committee)
University representative for PICTFOR (The Parliamentary Internet, Communications and Technology Forum).
Past President of EQANIE, the European Quality Assurance Network for Information Education

Research/scholarly interests
e-learning, serious games, software engineering, crisis management, affective computing, cybersecurity, e-Health, personalisation.

Personal life
Bacon is married to Stuart Kabler. Her hobbies are horse jumping, skiing and scuba diving.

References

1963 births
Living people
Academics of the University of Abertay Dundee
Alumni of the University of Greenwich
Fellows of the British Computer Society
English computer scientists
Presidents of the British Computer Society
People associated with CERN
British women computer scientists
People from Surrey
Principal Fellows of the Higher Education Academy